Evgeny "Eugen" Evgenievich Slutsky (– 10 March 1948) was a Russian and Soviet mathematical statistician, economist and political economist.

Work in economics
Slutsky is principally known for work in deriving the relationships embodied in the very well known Slutsky equation which is widely used in microeconomic consumer theory for separating the substitution effect and the income effect of a price change on the total quantity of a good demanded following a price change in that good, or in a related good that may have a cross-price effect on the original good quantity. There are many Slutsky analogs in producer theory.

He is less well known by Western economists than some of his contemporaries, due to his own changing intellectual interests as well as external factors forced upon him after the Bolshevik Revolution in 1917.  His seminal paper in Economics, and some argue his last paper in Economics rather than probability theory, was published in 1915 (Sulla teoria del bilancio del consumatore).  Paul Samuelson noted that until 1936, he had been entirely unaware of Slutsky's 1915 "masterpiece" due to World War I and the paper's Italian language publication.  R. G. D. Allen did the most to propagate Slutsky's work on consumer theory in published papers in 1936 and 1950.

Vincent Barnett argues:
"A good case can be made for the notion that Slutsky is the most famous of all Russian economists, even more well-known [than] N. D. Kondratiev, L. V. Kantorovich, or Mikhail Tugan-Baranovsky.  There are eponymous concepts such as the Slutsky equation, the Slutsky diamond, the Slutsky matrix, and the Slutsky-Yule effect, and a journals-literature search conducted on his name for the years 1980-1995 yielded seventy-nine articles directly using some aspect of Slutsky’s work... Moreover, many microeconomics textbooks contain prominent mention of Slutsky’s contribution to the theory of consumer behavior, most notably the Slutsky equation, christened by John Hicks as the ‘Fundamental Equation of Value Theory'. Slutsky’s work is thus an integral part of contemporary mainstream economics and econometrics, a claim that cannot really be made by any other Soviet economist, perhaps even by any other Russian economist."

The Slutsky Effect
In the 1920s, Slutsky turned to working on probability theory and stochastic processes, but in 1927 he published his second famous article on economic theory, 'The Summation of Random Causes as a Source of Cyclical Processes'. This showed that it was possible for apparently cyclic behaviour to emerge as the result of random shocks to the economy if the latter were modelled using a stable stochastic difference equation with certain technical properties. This opened up a new approach to business cycle theory by hypothesising that the interaction of chance events could generate periodicity when none existed initially.

Mathematical statistics work
Slutsky's later work was principally in probability theory and the theory of stochastic processes. He is generally credited for the result known as Slutsky's theorem. In 1928 he was an Invited Speaker of the ICM in Bologna.

References

Further reading

External links
 
 New School
 Oscar Sheynin on Slutsky: p. 105 of Russian Papers on the History of Probability and Statistics

1880 births
1948 deaths
People from Yaroslavl Oblast
Statisticians from the Russian Empire
Soviet mathematicians
Russian economists
Mathematical statisticians
Russian statisticians